may refer to multiple railway stations in Japan:

 Daimon Station (Aichi) on the Aichi Loop Line
 Daimon Station (Hiroshima) on the Sanyō Main Line
 Daimon Station (Tokyo) on the Toei Asakusa Line and the Toei Ōedo Line